Events in the year 2020 in Israel.

Incumbents
 President of Israel – Reuven Rivlin
 Prime Minister of Israel – Benjamin Netanyahu 
 President of the Supreme Court – Esther Hayut
 Chief of General Staff – Aviv Kochavi
 Government of Israel – Thirty-fourth government of Israel and Thirty-fifth government of Israel

Events

January
 1 January
 Prime Minister Netanyahu requests parliamentary immunity from the corruption charges against him.
 Jordan receives its first shipment of natural gas from Israel.
 5 January – Greece and Israel sign an agreement to build the longest underwater gas pipeline in the world.
 6 January – The Leviathan gas field begins full operations.
 7 January – Israeli firm Armis is bought for over US$1 billion by Insight Partners.
 23 January – The Fifth World Holocaust Forum is held in Jerusalem; President Reuven Rivlin is among world leaders who deliver a speech at this occasion.
 27 January
 The 75th anniversary of the liberation of the Auschwitz concentration camp is commemorated around the world; Israeli President Reuven Rivlin attends the ceremony at the site of Auschwitz, along with the President of Poland and both leaders condemn the current resurgence of antisemitism.
 President Rivlin meets with President Andrzej Duda of Poland, and discusses the role of individual Poles in the Holocaust.

 28 January
 At the White House, US President Donald Trump unveils his Israeli–Palestinian peace plan, alongside Israeli Prime Minister Benjamin Netanyahu.
 President Rivlin visits Germany and meets with schoolchildren and German officials, including Defense Minister Annegret Kramp-Karrenbauer.
 29 January – The Naama Issachar affair ends with a pardon from Russian President Vladimir Putin and her release from a Russian prison.

February
 11 February – Israel announces it will install a new water system for use in maximum-security prisons, after discovering that some prisoners are wasting water on purpose.
 12 February – The United Nations Office of the High Commissioner for Human Rights (OHCHR) publishes a database of 112 business entities involved in Jewish settlements in the West Bank.
 21 February – The first case of the COVID-19 pandemic in Israel is confirmed when a female citizen tests positive for COVID-19 after returning from quarantine on the Diamond Princess cruise ship.

March
 2 March – The 2020 Israeli legislative election takes place; incumbent Prime Minister Benjamin Netanyahu's bloc of right-wing and religious parties again win 58 seats, three short of the majority in the next Knesset required to form a government.
 20 March – An 88-year-old Holocaust survivor in Jerusalem is the country's first fatality of the COVID-19 pandemic in Israel.
 22 March – Eden Alene is chosen to represent Israel in the 2021 Eurovision Song Contest.

April

 8 April – The first nationwide lockdown to combat the COVID-19 pandemic in Israel begins on the first night of Passover.
 20 April – The leaders of the two largest parties in the Knesset, Benny Gantz (Blue and White) and Benjamin Netanyahu (Likud), announce that they have reached a coalition agreement to form the next government of Israel, with an alternating premiership arrangement between the two men.

May
 17 May – The 35th government of Israel is sworn in.

July

 Thousands of Israelis protest in front of the Prime Ministers residence demanding the resignation of Prime Minister Benjamin Netanyahu, over his indictment on corruption charges as well as mismanagement of the COVID-19 pandemic and economic crisis.
 3 July – Michael Ben Zikri drowns after rescuing a Bedouin Arab family from a sinkhole near a manmade lake south of Ashkelon; Israeli Bedouin and Arabs as well as people in Egypt, Iraq, Morocco, Oman and Syria are among those who praise his heroic self-sacrifice.
 13 July 2020 – Hapoel Be'er Sheva defeats Maccabi Petah Tikva 2–0 to win the 2019–20 Israel State Cup in Association Football at Bloomfield Stadium in Tel Aviv.

August
 13 August – The Israel–United Arab Emirates peace agreement is announced.
 30 August – Israel sends 10 elite firefighters to California to assist local firefighters battling some of the largest fires in the state's recent history.

September

 11 September – The Bahrain–Israel normalization agreement is announced, with the two countries agreeing to establish full diplomatic relations.
 15 September – Bahrain Foreign Minister Abdullatif bin Rashid Al Zayani, UAE Foreign Minister Abdullah bin Zayed Al Nahyan and Prime Minister Benjamin Netanyahu sign the "Abraham Accords" establishing formal relations between Israel and the two Arab countries, at a ceremony in Washington, D.C.
 25 September – The government imposes a second, two-week long lockdown in response to the COVID-19 pandemic in Israel, closing all but essential businesses, and strictly limiting movement and public gatherings.
 30 September – Israel's parliament passes a law authorizing the "special coronavirus emergency" and continuing to limit public gatherings; the law is criticized in particular for limiting demonstrations against Prime Minister Benjamin Netanyahu over alleged corruption and mismanagement of the COVID-19 pandemic in Israel.

October 
 14 October – Israeli and Lebanese delegations begin talks, facilitated by the United Nations and the United States, over their disputed maritime border.
 20 – 22 October – The 38th World Zionist Congress is conducted from Jerusalem by online sessions, with the participation of over 700 delegates and thousands of people from 35 countries to elect leadership positions and determine policy for the World Zionist Organization.
 23 October – The Israel–Sudan normalization agreement, whereby Israel and Sudan agree to normalize relations, is announced, making Sudan the fifth Arab country to establish formal relations with Israel.

November
 9 November – An IsraAid team arrived in Alta Verapaz, Guatemala, following Hurricane Eta, to provide psychological first aid, medical support and relief items, as well as hygiene kits and water filters to help reduce the spread of COVID-19.

December 
 10 December – Morocco and Israel agree to establish diplomatic relations, and Morocco becomes the sixth Arab country to recognize Israel.
 12 December – Bhutan establishes diplomatic relations with Israel.
 20 December – COVID-19 vaccination begins with doses from both Pfizer and Moderna to first immunize healthcare workers, followed by the elderly and others at high-risk.
 23 December – The 23rd Knesset is dissolved as the deadline to approve the 2020 state budget expires without agreement, requiring elections for the fourth time in less than two years.
 27 December – A third national lockdown begins since the start of the pandemic in response to a resurgence of COVID-19 infections; most schools remain open.
 30 December – Former American spy Jonathan Pollard and his wife arrive in Israel.

Deaths

See also

 2019–20 Israeli constitutional crisis
 2019–20 Israeli political crisis
 COVID-19 pandemic in Israel
 Timeline of the Israeli–Palestinian conflict, 2020

References

 
2020s in Israel
Years of the 21st century in Israel
Israel
Israel